Cansu Çetin (born 26 May 1993 in Ankara, Turkey) is a Turkish female volleyball player. She was with Sarıyer Belediyesi before she transferred in 2014 to Beşiktaş. After one season with Beşiktaş she transferred to the VakıfBank S.K. Çetin is a member of the Turkey women's national volleyball team.

Personal life
After attending Ankara Esenevler Anadolu Highschool for three years, she continued at İstanbul Yeni Levent Highschool, where she graduated from. Currently, she is a student of Psychology at Özyeğin University.

Career

Clubs
Cansu Çetin began her sports career at the age of 13 in Çankaya Belediyespor in Ankara. Between 2008 and 2010, she played in the youth, junior and senior teams of İller Bankası. In 2010, she transferred to Eczacıbaşı VitrA. Her club loaned out her between 2011 and 2014 to Sarıyer Belediyesi, which became champion in the 2011–12 season, and was so promoted to Turkish Women's Volleyball League.  For the 2014–15 season, she was loaned out to Yeşilyurt. She officially joined Fenerbahçe in August 2020.

National team
She was called up to the Turkey women's national volleyball team, and played at the 2014 Women's European Volleyball League that won the gold medal.

Awards

National team
2014 Women's European Volleyball League -  champion

See also
 Turkish women in sports

References

1993 births
Sportspeople from Ankara
Özyeğin University alumni
Turkish women's volleyball players
İller Bankası volleyballers
Eczacıbaşı volleyball players
Sarıyer Belediyesi volleyballers
Yeşilyurt volleyballers
Living people
Galatasaray S.K. (women's volleyball) players
20th-century Turkish sportswomen
21st-century Turkish sportswomen